The Popular Action of Equatorial Guinea is a political party in Equatorial Guinea. It is led by Carmelo Mba Bacalé. It is currently one of many opposition parties in the country banned by the ruling party, the Democratic Party of Equatorial Guinea, in power since 1979.

Bacalé gained 0.16% of the country's vote for the AP in the 2009 Equatoguinean presidential election.

Electoral history

Presidential elections

References

Banned political parties
Political parties in Equatorial Guinea
Political parties established in 1990
Christian democratic parties in Africa